The Secret is a 1955 British crime drama directed by Cy Endfield and starring Sam Wanamaker, Mandy Miller, and André Morell.

Plot
Nick Delaney, an American stranded in England without money, meets a woman who has smuggled diamonds into the country inside a teddy bear. But his hopes for financial aid are shattered when she is pushed from a cliff. Delaney then finds himself the prime suspect. He finally gets his hands on the gems but loses them to a gang of crooks. Can Delaney prove his innocence and shop the crooks to the police?

Cast
 Sam Wanamaker as Nick Delaney
 Mandy Miller as Katie Martin
 André Morell as Chief Inspector Blake
 Marian Spencer as Aunt Doris
 Jan Miller as Margaret
 Richard O'Sullivan as John Martin
 Wyndham Goldie as Doctor Scott
 Henry Caine as Superintendent
 Aimée Delamain as Miss Lyons
 John Miller as Toy Shop Assistant
 Harold Berens as Frank Farmer

Critical reception
TV Guide called the film "slow going, with a few moments of excitement." Sky Movies called it a "taut thriller."

References

External links
 

1955 films
British crime drama films
Films set in Brighton
Films directed by Cy Endfield
1950s English-language films
1950s British films
1955 crime drama films